The two-dimensional point vortex gas is a discrete particle model used to study turbulence in two-dimensional ideal fluids. The two-dimensional guiding-center plasma is a completely equivalent model used in plasma physics.

General setup
The model is a Hamiltonian system of N points in the two-dimensional plane executing the motion

(In the confined version of the problem, the logarithmic potential is modified.)

Interpretations
In the point-vortex gas interpretation, the particles represent either point vortices in a two-dimensional fluid, or parallel line vortices in a three-dimensional fluid. The constant ki is the circulation of the fluid around the ith vortex. The Hamiltonian H is the interaction term of the fluid's integrated kinetic energy; it may be either positive or negative. The equations of motion simply reflect the drift of each vortex's position in the velocity field of the other vortices.

In the guiding-center plasma interpretation, the particles represent long filaments of charge parallel to some external magnetic field. The constant ki is the linear charge density of the ith filament. The Hamiltonian H is just the two-dimensional Coulomb potential between lines. The equations of motion reflect the guiding center drift of the charge filaments, hence the name.

See also
List of plasma (physics) articles

Notes

References

Turbulence models
Plasma physics